Cnephasia paterna is a species of moth in the family Tortricidae. It is endemic to New Zealand. This species is classified as Nationally Endangered by the Department of Conservation.

Taxonomy 
C. paterna was described by Alfred Philpott in 1926 using a male specimen collected by Stuart Lindsay on the 31 March 1923. George Vernon Hudson illustrated the type specimen of the moth in his 1928 publication The Butterflies and Moths of New Zealand. Although the type locality given by Philpott is Little River, evidence suggests that this locality is incorrect. The genus level classification of New Zealand endemic moths within the genus Cnephasia is regarded as unsatisfactory and is under revision. As such the species is currently also known as Cnephasia (s.l.) paterna. The type specimen is held at Canterbury Museum.

Description 
Philpott described the species as follows:

Distribution 
This species is endemic to New Zealand and has only been found in the South Island. The type specimen remained unique until the species was rediscovered by Brian Patrick on the 28 May 2012 at Saddle Hill, Banks Peninsula. This locality remains the only site where this species has been found.

Habitat 
The rediscovery of the species occurred on south-eastern slopes at an altitude of 750-800m amongst the snow tussock Chionochloa rigida.

Life history and biology 
Much information on biology and life cycle of this moth is yet to be discovered and the species has not yet been reared. Patrick hypothesises that the larvae of this species feed in silken tunnels and that they have an annual life-cycle. Adults emerge in the late autumn or early winter. Hudson records the insect being collectable at the end of March. The female of this species is short wings and flightless, which inhibits the dispersal of the species. The male of the species are active during the day and are regarded as fast flyers.

Conservation status 
This species has been classified under the New Zealand Threat Classification system as being Nationally Endangered.

References

External links
 Image of moth can be found on page 20 

Moths described in 1926
Cnephasiini
Moths of New Zealand
Endemic fauna of New Zealand
Endangered biota of New Zealand
Endemic moths of New Zealand